Saeed Vasei is an Iranian professional footballer who last played as a midfielder for Foolad in the Persian Gulf pro league.

Club career
Vasei started his career with Saipa Mashhad Academy. He also had experiences in Ghadir Khorasan, Sanat Khorasan and Mes Kerman Academies. Vasei joined to Siah Jamegan in summer 2014 and was part of the club in promotion to Persian Gulf Pro League in 2015. He made his professional debut for Siah Jamegan on August 7, 2015 in 1-0 loss against Esteghlal Ahvaz as a substitute for Milan Jovanović.

In 2019, Saeed Vasei was invited to the Iranian national team by Valimots and played a game against the Omid national team

Tractor 
On 12 October 2020, Vasei signed a contract with Persian Gulf pro league at Tractor .

Club career statistics

References

 Iran - S. Vaseei - Profile with news, career statistics and history - Soccerway". int.soccerway.com  Retrieved int.soccerway.com.
 https://mehrnews.com/xSTJY Retrieved mehrnews.com
 https://www.varzesh3.com/Search?q=%D9%88%D8%A7%D8%B3%D8%B9%DB%8C Retrieved varzesh3.com
 https://globalsportsarchive.com/people/soccer/saeid-vaseei/110842/
سعید واسعی به تراکتور پیوست Retrieved Saeed Vasei joined the tractor varzesh 3    (in Persian). 
سعید واسعی  Retrieved (in Persian).
Saeed Vasei Biography Retrieved (in Persian).
Saeed Vasei Retrieved joined Traktor with an official contract. Source: Traktor Club's home page on Instagram 
سوپرگل سعید واسعی در بازی پرسپولیس و پیکان/ ویدیو Retrieved (in Persian).
Saeed Vasei Retrieved (in Persian).
سعید واسعی تراکتور مدعی اصلی قهرمانی است  Retrieved khabarvarzeshi.com (in Persian).
تراکتور و پیکان چگونه درباره واسعی توافق می کنند؟ Retrieved (in Persian).
قراردادم نصف قرارداد بازیکنان جدید استقلال است سرپرست باشگاه من را نخواستRetrieved Retrieved (in Persian).
سعید واسعی از استقلال هایجکهایجک شد  Retrieved (in Persian).
اطلاعات سعید واسعی از Retrieved (in Persian).

External links
Saeed Vasei at persianlegue

Saeed Vasei at FootballDatabase.eu

Saeed Vasei at playmakerstats.com

Saeed Vasei at footballcritice

Saeed Vasei  at Soccerway

 

Saeid Vasei at IranLeague.ir

1994 births
Living people
Iranian footballers
Siah Jamegan players
Paykan F.C. players
Tractor S.C. players
Foolad FC players
Association football midfielders